Franczak is a Polish surname, it may refer to:
 Adrian Franczak, Polish footballer
 Józef Franczak, Polish Army and resistance soldier
 Paweł Franczak (born 1991), Polish cyclist
 Stefan Franczak, Polish horticulturist
 Thomas Franczak, American Computer Science Researcher